The 1897–98 Rugby Union County Championship was the tenth edition of England's premier rugby union club competition at the time.

Northumberland won the competition for the first time defeating Midland Counties in the final. The Midlands team was weakened by the refusal of Leicester to release their players for the county team.

Final

See also
 English rugby union system
 Rugby union in England

References

Rugby Union County Championship
County Championship (rugby union) seasons